The Leawood Pump House (also known as High Peak Pump House) was built near Cromford, Derbyshire, England in 1849 to supply water to the Cromford Canal, built some 50 years previously. It is a Grade II* listed building.

The Watt-type beam engine was designed and erected by Graham and Company of Milton Works, Elsecar, Sheffield. The boilers, replaced in 1900, have a pressure of 40 p.s.i. 

Water is drawn from the River Derwent through a  tunnel to a reservoir in the basement. It is then lifted  and discharged into the canal.

The immense size of the pump (which can transfer almost four tons of water per stroke and seven strokes a minute, a total of over 39,000 tons of water per 24 hours) is explained by the fact that there were restrictions on removing water from the Derwent river, this being allowed only between 8 p.m. on Saturdays and 8 p.m. on Sundays.

The pumphouse worked continuously from 1849 until 1944 when the canal closed. It was restored in 1979 by the Cromford Canal Society and is run periodically.

References

External links

Leawood Pumphouse website
DerbyPhotos website with history and photographs
A video of the pump working

Grade II* listed buildings in Derbyshire
Grade II* listed industrial buildings
Buildings and structures in Derbyshire
Preserved beam engines
Infrastructure completed in 1849
Museums in Derbyshire
Steam museums in England
Canal museums in England
Water supply pumping stations
1849 establishments in England
Former pumping stations